Non-Resident Indians (NRIs) in Saudi Arabia ) are the largest community of expatriates in the country, most of them coming from the states of  Andhra Pradesh, Jharkhand, West Bengal, Karnataka, Kerala, Maharashtra, Tamil Nadu, Telangana and most recently, Bihar, Uttar Pradesh and Gujarat.

Overview
Indians as migrant workers first began to arrive in modern-day Saudi Arabia in relatively small number from the British Raj soon after the discovery of oil in 1938, but had their migration skyrocketed exponentially after the 1973 energy crisis and subsequent oil boom. However, migration to Saudi Arabia dropped dramatically after reaching its peak in 2014 due to the introduction of Nitaqat scheme in 2011, acceleration of 2010s oil glut by early 2016 and the launch of Saudi Vision 2030.

History
India and Saudi Arabia signed an agreement to manage and organize the recruitment of domestic workers in January 2014. Between then and April 2016, 500,000 Indians moved to Saudi Arabia for employment. The agreement includes a provision which stipulates that sponsors must pay a guarantee of US $2,500 for each Indian worker they recruit.

Demographics
The following table shows the estimated population of Indians in Saudi Arabia since 1975.

Education
Indian curriculum schools in Saudi Arabia include:

Dammam 
 International Indian School, Dammam

Riyadh 
 International Indian School, Riyadh
 New Middle East International School, Riyadh
International Indian Public School, Riyadh
 Al-Yasmin International School, Riyadh
Al Alia International Indian School
Yara International School

Jeddah 
 Talal International School, Jeddah
 International Indian School Jeddah

Buraidah 
 International Indian School Buraidah

Jubail 

 International Indian School, Al-Jubail

Notable Indian Saudi Arabians
Abdulbasit Hindi, Saudi Arabian footballer of distant Indian origin
Awaiz Patni, Group CFO - Bugshan Investment

See also
 Indian Saudis
India – Saudi Arabia relations

References

Ethnic groups in Saudi Arabia
Saudi Arabia
 
India–Saudi Arabia relations
Indian diaspora
Ethnic groups in the Middle East